Annibal is the French masculine given name equivalent to Hannibal.

It may refer to:

People
Annibal Camoux (1638?–1759), French soldier noted for his claimed longevity
Annibal de Coconnas (died 1574), a co-conspirator of Joseph Boniface de La Môle against King Charles IX of France
Annibal Grimaldi (died 1621), Count of Beuil and governor of the County of Nice

Ships
French ship Annibal, six ships of the French Navy
Annibal-class ship of the line, a type of 74-gun ship of the French Navy

Other uses
Annibal (Marivaux), an 18th-century play by Pierre de Marivaux

See also
Annibale, the Italian form of the name
Aníbal (name), the Spanish and Portuguese form of the name
Anibal Zahle, a Lebanese sports club based in Zahle, Lebanon